Jeanne-Marie Sens (born 8 December 1937 in Paris) is a French singer, songwriter, author and editor.

Biography

Jeanne-Marie Sens began recording in the early 1970s, including adopting the Giani Esposito song Les Clowns in 1972, released the following year by the Warner label. 
Her inspiration is at times melancholic, poetic and refractory in the face of an increasingly dehumanized world. 
In 1973 her protest song En plein cœur, in which her lyrics are set to music by Jean-Pierre Pouret, achieved success and notoriety. 
The following year brought her another hit with the prescient and sad portrait of a child cooped up in the city: L’Enfant du 92e, for which she co-wrote the lyrics with Lowery, 
set to the music of Belgian singer-interpreter Pierre Rapsat.

Jeanne-Marie Sens gives the impression of preferring to live in a world of imagination and fantasy, more beautiful than reality, 
and the many records she aimed at a child audience tend to confirm this.  
A song from an album of children's songs, Chansons pour de vrai, Volume 2 (1977) brought her the greatest popular success: Tant et tant de temps (So many times), with music composed by Jean-Pierre Castelain. 
From then on she worked almost exclusively with this composer. 
Despite their successful and talented association, however, her popularity began to decline.

In 1981, she signed a plea for acceptance of homosexuality, Il a la tête d’un poète, and incorporated the petition created that year by Jean-Pierre Castelain for the coming presidential elections, Je donnerai ma voix with a text by Maxime Piolot. 
After that she ceased making albums. 
Her last two 45s have the last beautiful works of the Sens-Castelain partnership: Au jardin un dimanche (1983), and Jalousie and Donne-moi ton sourire (1984).

In the early 1990s she and Hubert Tonka co-founded the Sens & Tonka publishing house.

Partial discography

45 Recordings

Éditions Gamma référence: CED 22011, 1972.
"Les Clowns"
Lyrics and music: Giani Esposito
"L'Hautil"
Lyrics: J.P. Orfino 
Music: M. Bonnecarrère
 
Éditions Atlantic/WEA référence: 10970, 1977.
"Tant et tant de temps"
"Quelques mots pour lui"
Lyrics: Jeanne-Marie Sens
Music: Jean-Pierre Castelain

 LP 33 Albums

"Chansons pour de vrai, vol.1."
Editions: Warner/Atlantic référence: 50099B distribution Wea/Filipachi music. 1974.
Lyrics: Jeanne-Marie Sens
Music: Jean-Pierre Castelain
Produced by Jean Pierre Orfino.

"Chansons pour de vrai, vol.2."
Editions Warner/Atlantic référence: 50416 distribution Wea/Filipachi music. 1977.
Lyrics: Jeanne-Marie Sens
Music: Jean-Pierre Castelain
Produced by Jean Pierre Orfino.

"Chansons pour de vrai, vol.3."
Editions Warner/Atlantic référence: 50543SE distribution Wea/Filipachi music. 1978.
Lyrics: Jeanne-Marie Sens
Music: Jean-Pierre Castelain
Produced by Jean Pierre Orfino.

Compilation
 Les Plus belles chansons de Jeanne-Marie Sens (1 CD Warner)

Bibliography 
Essays
 Locus & Beyond, Massimiliano Fuksas : Twenty-five years of architecture in Italy, France and Germany, Éditions Pandora, 1992, 
 With Jean-Loup Sieff, Les Mots tout court, Éditions Sens & Tonka, Paris, 1994, 
 With Hubert Tonka, Le Bateau Ivre de Jean Nouvel,  Éditions Sens & Tonka, Paris, 1994, 
 Trait d'union, Éditions Sens & Tonka, Paris, 1997, 
 Le Roman de dix jours, Éditions Sens & Tonka, Paris, 1997, 
 Bateau ivre, maison particulière, rouge et noire, Éditions Sens & Tonka, Paris, 1997, 
 Les Murs de Rome, le Trastevere, Éditions Sens & Tonka, Paris, 1999, 
 Que je sais d'elle, Éditions Sens & Tonka, Paris, 2000, 
 Opus cul : dix petites pièces en forme de figue, Éditions Sens & Tonka, Paris, 2002, 
 With Hubert Tonka, Les Simagrées de l'art urbain ou Comment ne pas meubler la ville comme on décore un salon, Éditions Sens & Tonka, Paris, 2002, 

Anthologies
 With Hubert Tonka (Collectif), X : Cent auteurs pour un anniversaire : Dix ans donc ! (2 volumes), Éditions Sens & Tonka, Paris, 2005, 

Novels
 Commencer quelque chose un lundi de novembre, Éditions Sens & Tonka, Paris, 2002, 
 La Ligne contrainte, Éditions Sens & Tonka, Paris, 2005, 

Other
 La Mouche sous un verre, Éditions Sens & Tonka, Paris,1994, 
 Effets indésirables, Éditions Sens & Tonka, Paris, 2003, 
 Vive moi !!, Éditions Sens & Tonka, Paris, 2004,

References

External links
 Discographie complète de Jeanne-Marie Sens, sur un site consacré à Jean Pierre Castelain

Living people
1937 births
French singer-songwriters
French women singers
Musicians from Paris